Minuscule 310 (in the Gregory-Aland numbering), Nμ21 (Soden), is a Greek minuscule manuscript of the New Testament, on parchment. Palaeographically it has been assigned to the 12th century.

Description 

The codex contains the text of the Gospel of Matthew 1:7-12:37; 16:4 on 378 parchment leaves with lacunae. The text is written in one column per page, in 27 lines per page. The biblical text is surrounded by a catena.

Text 

The Greek text of the codex is a representative of the Byzantine text-type. Aland placed it in Category V.

History 

The manuscript was presented by Provost Arsenius to St. Saba's monastery. It was added to the list of New Testament manuscripts by Scholz (1794-1852).
It was examined and described by Paulin Martin. C. R. Gregory saw the manuscript in 1885.

The manuscript is currently housed at the Bibliothèque nationale de France (Gr. 202) at Paris.

See also 

 List of New Testament minuscules
 Biblical manuscript
 Textual criticism

References

Further reading 

 

Greek New Testament minuscules
12th-century biblical manuscripts
Bibliothèque nationale de France collections